SS Fairport was a Type C2-S-E1 cargo ship built by Gulf Shipbuilding for the Waterman Steamship Company. All hands were rescued by an American destroyer.

Career 
Fairport was laid down as the first ship constructed at Gulf Shipbuilding of Chickasaw, Alabama. Constructed under a United States Maritime Commission contract (MC hull number 849) on behalf of the Waterman Steamship Company of Mobile, Alabama, she was launched on 15 November 1941. After Fairports April 1942 completion, she  was registered at Mobile and armed with a  deck gun and six machine guns, and took on fourteen Naval Armed Guardsmen to man the guns.

On 13 July 1942, Fairport departed New York with convoy WS 4 for the Persian Gulf. The convoy consisted of six other merchant ships and an escort of three destroyers; Fairports station in the convoy was in position #12, the second ship in the port column.

The first torpedo struck the cargo ship's #4 cargo hold on the port side, starting a fire that was quickly extinguished by inrushing seawater. The second torpedo struck ten seconds after the first, and opened a  hole near the #1 hold. The engines were secured and the vessel ordered abandoned five minutes later. Fifteen minutes after the attack, Fairport sank by the stern. All 123 persons aboard the ship (10 officers, 33 men, 14 Naval Armed Guardsmen, 66 passengers) were rescued by destroyer , and landed at New York on 21 July.

Notes

References 
 

 

Type C2-S-E1 ships
Ships built in Chickasaw, Alabama
1941 ships
World War II merchant ships of the United States
Ships sunk by German submarines in World War II
World War II shipwrecks in the Atlantic Ocean
Maritime incidents in July 1942